is a Japanese former baseball pitcher. He has played in Nippon Professional Baseball (NPB) for the Fukuoka SoftBank Hawks and Tokyo Yakult Swallows.

On November 2, Yamanaka announced his retirement.

References

External links

 NPB.com

1985 births
Living people
Asian Games bronze medalists for Japan
Asian Games medalists in baseball
Baseball people from Kumamoto Prefecture
Baseball players at the 2010 Asian Games
Fukuoka SoftBank Hawks players
Japanese baseball players
Medalists at the 2010 Asian Games
National baseball team players
Nippon Professional Baseball pitchers
Tokyo Yakult Swallows players